Jorge Sebastián Sáez ( born 24 January 1985) is an Argentine footballer who plays as a striker on Chilean club Everton.

Honours

Club
Universidad Católica
 Primera División de Chile (2): 2018, 2019
 Supercopa de Chile (1): 2019

Individual
 Primera División de Chile Top-scorer (2): 2012 Clausura, 2013 Transición

References

External links
 Sebastián Sáez at Football-Lineups
 Sebastián Sáez at Fútbol XXI  
 
 

1985 births
Living people
Argentine footballers
Argentine expatriate footballers
Tiro Federal footballers
Talleres de Córdoba footballers
Audax Italiano footballers
Chilean Primera División players
Emirates Club players
Al-Wakrah SC players
Expatriate footballers in Chile
Expatriate footballers in the United Arab Emirates
Expatriate footballers in Qatar
Qatar Stars League players
UAE Pro League players
Club Deportivo Universidad Católica footballers
Unión La Calera footballers
Everton de Viña del Mar footballers
Association football forwards
People from Santiago del Estero
Sportspeople from Santiago del Estero Province